The 1832 United States presidential election in North Carolina took place between November 2 and December 5, 1832, as part of the 1832 United States presidential election. Voters chose 15 representatives, or electors to the Electoral College, who voted for President and Vice President.

North Carolina voted for the Democratic Party candidate, Andrew Jackson, over the National Republican candidate, Henry Clay. Jackson won North Carolina by a margin of 69.54 points. , this is the last occasion when Wilkes County voted for a Democratic presidential candidate.

Results

References

North Carolina
1832
1832 North Carolina elections